Zilioli is an Italian surname. Notable people with the surname include:

 Cesare Zilioli (born 1938), Italian sprint canoeist
 Gianfranco Zilioli (born 1990), Italian cyclist
 Italo Zilioli (born 1941), Italian cyclist

Italian-language surnames